Daniel Chester Forest Sims is a Canadian historian specializing in the history of northern British Columbia. Born and brought up in Prince George, he is a member of the Tsay Keh Dene First Nation.  He received his Ph.D. in history from the University of Alberta in 2017 with a dissertation, nominated for the Governor-General's Gold Medal, entitled Dam Bennett: The Impact of the W. A. C. Bennett Dam and Williston Lake Reservoir on the Tsek'ehne of Northern British Columbia.

He is Associate Professor of First Nations Studies at the University of Northern British Columbia, where he served as Chair from 2020-2022, and a member of the council of the Canadian Historical Association. He was previously assistant professor of history at the University of Alberta – Augustana campus.

Selected publications

“Balloon Bombs, the Alaskan Highway and Influenza: Tsek’ehne Perspectives of the 1943 Flu Epidemic,” BC Studies, no. 203 (2019): 111-130.
“Accrued Many Rights: The Ingenika Tsay Keh Nay, Mennonite Missionaries, and Land Claims in the Late Twentieth Century,” Journal of Mennonite Studies 37 (2019): 87-104.
“‘Not That Kind of Indian:’ The Problem with Generalizing Indigenous Peoples in Contemporary Scholarship and Pedagogy.”  Active History.ca 12 January 2017.
“Ware’s Waldo: Hydroelectric Development and the Creation of the Other in British Columbia,” in Sustaining the West: Cultural Responses to Western Environments, Past and Present. Eds. Liza Piper and Lisa Szabo-Jones (Waterloo: Wilfrid Laurier Press, 2015).

References

External links
Ph.D. dissertation
 Sims discussing his research
Radio interview of 2021-09-20 beginning at 35:00.
journal article - Not that kind of Indian.
Review of book Kwanlin Dün: Dǎ Kwǎndur Ghày Ghàkwadîndur – Our Story in Our Words by Kwanlin Dün First Nation

First Nations academics
Sekani people
Academic staff of the University of Northern British Columbia
People from Prince George, British Columbia
Year of birth missing (living people)
Living people